Fimbristylis dichotoma, commonly known as forked fimbry or eight day grass, is a sedge of the family Cyperaceae that is native to tropical areas.

Description
The annual or perennial plant, 10–80 cm tall, with numerous long stems about 2 mm in diameter, slightly three-angled, compressed below the inflorescence, node-less, smooth and has a tufted habit. The root system is fibrous, wiry, black. Short rhizomes. Leaves numerous, forming a dense tuft at the base of the stem, being at least half as long as the stem.

Distribution
Fimbristylis dichotoma is widely distributed in Asia, Africa and Australia  as well as in other parts of the tropics.

Habitat
Fimbristylis dichotoma grows well on wet or even flooded soil; it is also found in uplands where the soil has good water retention. It is also found in swamps, open waste places, grassy roadsides, Imperata cylindrica grasslands and some plantation crops.

References

External links

dichotoma
Plants described in 1805
Flora of Western Australia